The Joseph Herman Log Stable is a historic stable located in Tabor, South Dakota. It was added  to the National Register of Historic Places on July 6, 1987, as part of a "Thematic Nomination of Czech Folk Architecture of Southeastern South Dakota".

See also
National Register of Historic Places listings in Bon Homme County, South Dakota

References

Buildings and structures in Tabor, South Dakota
Czech-American culture in South Dakota